Glaciokarst is a karst landscape that was glaciated during the cold periods of the Pleistocene and displays major landforms of glacial influence.

Examples of glaciokarst landscapes are found in the United Kingdom and in the Dinaric Alps especially at Orjen, and in the Alps (e.g. the Kanin Plateau with the Vrtiglavica shaft).

References

Glacial landforms
Karst
Pleistocene geology
Dinaric Alps
Dinaric karst formations
Karst formations of Bosnia and Herzegovina
Glacial erosion landforms